The 1978 Virginia Slims of Washington  was a women's tennis tournament played on indoor carpet courts at the GWU Charles Smith Center and the Capital Centre in Washington D.C., District of Columbia in the United States that was part of the 1978 Virginia Slims World Championship Series. It was the seventh edition of the tournament and was held from January 2 through January 8, 1978. First-seeded Martina Navratilova won the singles title and earned $20,000 first-prize money.

Finals

Singles
 Martina Navratilova defeated  Betty Stöve 7–5, 6–4
 It was Navratilova's 1st singles title of the year and the 14th of her career.

Doubles
 Billie Jean King /  Martina Navratilova defeated  Betty Stöve /  Wendy Turnbull 6–3, 7–5

Prize money

References

External links
 Women's Tennis Association (WTA) tournament details
 International Tennis Federation (ITF) tournament edition details

Virginia Slims of Washington
Virginia Slims of Washington
1978 in sports in Washington, D.C.
Virgin